D.R. Mullins (born April 18, 1958) is a multidimensional visual artist from the Appalachian region of southwest Virginia. Mullins' artwork is often rich with depictions of Appalachian culture and Buddhist philosophy. Over the past 35 years, Mullins' art has taken many shapes, forms, styles, and mediums. He is an accomplished portraitist, muralist, sculptor, theatrical set designer, interior designer, and free-lance painter residing in Shady Valley, Tennessee.

Early life and education
D.R. Mullins was born in Alexandria, Virginia, but, after his birth moved to the small town of Clintwood, Virginia. After graduating high school, Mullins was accepted on a full football scholarship to the University of North Carolina at Chapel Hill. A devastating knee injury put a halt to Mullins' athletic endeavours, but came to allow Mullins' more time to pursue his college major and second passion: art. Although he never completed his B.F.A., it was there that he learned the basic fundamentals of art.

Career
As a freelance artist, Mullins has worked many different jobs throughout his lifetime, all of which have had strong artistic influence.

Theatrical design
Mullins married wife, Robin Mullins, a native of Wise, Virginia and fellow artist, musician, and actor. Together they moved to Lexington, Virginia where they both worked at the outdoor Theatre at Lime Kiln. Here, artist D.R. Mullins worked on set design and most notably was commissioned to construct papier-mâché puppet heads that would be worn by eight-to-14-foot tall, stilt-walking actors. 
Mullins worked for many years at the historic state theatre of Virginia, Barter Theatre, where Mullins' served as Head Scenic Artist.

Murals
Mullins is often best known for his magnificently intricate and beautiful murals displayed throughout Virginia. 
Mullins' commissions include murals for the Virginia Gas Co., the Southwest Virginia Higher Education Center in Abingdon, the Virginia Highlands Community College, the Bristol (Virginia) Public Library, and Abingdon, Virginia's new cultural/art center, Heartwood.
"Appalachian Identity" at the Virginia Highlands Community College
"Going Places" at Bristol (Virginia) Public Library

Exhibitions
D.R. Mullins has shown his artwork in a multitude of spaces throughout the years with most prominent exhibitions in Philadelphia's Indigo Arts Gallery, the "8" gallery in Southport, NC, Kamen Gallery at Washington and Lee University, and William King Museum where Mullins shared in a three-man show entitled "Pillars of Bohemia".

References

1958 births
American muralists
People from Clintwood, Virginia
Artists from Virginia
Living people
People from Alexandria, Virginia